Batrachosuchoides is an extinct genus of prehistoric amphibian from the Early Triassic of Russia. It was found in the Baskunchakskaia Series and the Lestanshorskaya Svita.

See also
 Prehistoric amphibian
 List of prehistoric amphibians

References

Brachyopids